Fareed Gate is a historical gate of the old city of Bahawalpur, Pakistan.

History
It is named after Khwaja Ghulam Farid.

References

Buildings and structures in Bahawalpur
Mughal architecture
Tourist attractions in Bahawalpur
Gates in Pakistan